The New Forest Act 1800  (39 & 40 Geo 3 c 86) was an Act of the Parliament of Great Britain.

So much of this Act as subjected certain officers therein mentioned to forfeiture and deprivation of their offices for the offences in this Act mentioned was repealed and made void by section 6 of the Dean Forest Act 1819 (59 Geo 3 c 86).

The marginal note to that section said that the effect of this was to repeal section 23 of the New Forest Act 1800. This repeal was subject to a proviso.

The whole Act was repealed by section 1(4) of, and the Schedule to, the Wild Creatures and Forest Laws Act 1971.

References
Halsbury's Statutes,

Great Britain Acts of Parliament 1800
English forest law
New Forest